The Central District of Aradan County is a district (bakhsh) in Aradan County, Semnan Province, Iran. At the 2006 census, its population was 5,714, in 1,665 families.  The District has one city: Aradan. The District has two  rural districts (dehestan): Hoseynabad-e Kordehha Rural District, and Yateri Rural District. It was established in 2011, along with Aradan County.

References 

Districts of Semnan Province
Aradan County
2011 establishments in Iran